Ajjowal is a small village of Malikwal Tehsil, Mandi Bahauddin District in the Punjab province of Pakistan.

It is located at 32°30'0N 73°18'0E with an altitude of 218 metres (718 feet) and lies 26 km from Mandi Bahauddin city and 16 km from Malakwal.

References

External links
 Mandi Bahauddin
 News about Mandi Bahauddin

Villages in Mandi Bahauddin District